The BD postcode area, also known as the Bradford postcode area, is a group of 24 postcode districts in England, within seven post towns. These cover northwestern West Yorkshire (including Bradford, Bingley, Shipley, Cleckheaton and Keighley) and southwestern North Yorkshire (including Grassington, Settle and Skipton), plus very small parts of Lancashire.



Coverage
The approximate coverage of the postcode districts:

|-
! BD1
| BRADFORD
| Bradford City Centre, Little Germany, Goitside, Independent Quarter, West End, City Park
| Bradford
|-
! BD2
| BRADFORD
| Eccleshill, Five Lane Ends, parts of Undercliffe, Fagley, Bolton Woods, Poplars Farm, Swain House, Ashbourne, High House, Grove House
| Bradford
|-
! BD3
| BRADFORD
| Barkerend, Bradford Moor, Thornbury, Eastbrook, Pollard Park, parts of, Laisterdyke, Undercliffe, Wapping
| Bradford, Leeds
|-
! BD4
| BRADFORD
| Bierley, East Bowling, East Bierley, Laisterdyke, Tong, Tong Street, Holme Wood, Dudley Hill, Tyersal, Swaine Green, Cutler Heights, Tong Village
| Bradford, Leeds, Kirklees
|-
! BD5
| BRADFORD
| Bankfoot, Little Horton, West Bowling, Canterbury, Marshfields, Ripleyville,
| Bradford
|-
! BD6
| BRADFORD
| Buttershaw, Wibsey, Woodside, Westwood Park, Odsal, Staithgate, parts of Horton Bank Top (Cooperville)
| Bradford
|-
! BD7
| BRADFORD
| Great Horton, Lidget Green, Scholemoor, Horton Bank Top, Horton Grange
| Bradford
|-
! BD8
| BRADFORD
| Manningham, Girlington, White Abbey, Lower Grange, Four Lane Ends, Whetley, Longlands, West Park, Rhodesway, Crossley Hall, Belle Vue
| Bradford
|-
! BD9
| BRADFORD
| Frizinghall, Emman Lane, Heaton, Daisy Hill, Haworth Road Estate, Chellow Heights, Chellow Grange
| Bradford
|-
! BD10
| BRADFORD
| Apperley Bridge, parts of Eccleshill, Greengates, Idle, Ravenscliffe, Thackley, Thorpe Edge.
| Bradford, Leeds
|-
! BD11
| BRADFORD
| Adwalton, Birkenshaw, Cockersdale, Drighlington
| Kirklees, Leeds
|-
! BD12
| BRADFORD
| Low Moor, Oakenshaw, Wyke, Lower Wyke, Delph Hill
| Bradford, Kirklees
|-
! BD13
| BRADFORD
| Cullingworth, Clayton Heights Denholme, Queensbury, Thornton, School Green
| Bradford
|-
! BD14
| BRADFORD
| Clayton
| Bradford
|-
! BD15
| BRADFORD
| Allerton, Norr, Wilsden, Sandy Lane
| Bradford
|-
! BD16
| BINGLEY
| Bingley, Cottingley, Eldwick, Harden
| Bradford
|-
! BD17
| SHIPLEY
| Baildon, Shipley
| Bradford
|-
! BD18
| SHIPLEY
| Saltaire, Shipley, Windhill, Wrose
| Bradford
|-
! BD19
| CLECKHEATON
| Cleckheaton, Gomersal, Scholes
| Kirklees
|-
! BD20
| KEIGHLEY
| Cononley, Lothersdale, Cross Hills, Glusburn, Kildwick, Silsden, Steeton, Utley, West Yorkshire, Sutton-in-Craven, Bradley, North Yorkshire, Farnhill
| Bradford, Craven
|-
! BD21
| KEIGHLEY
| Hainworth, Keighley
| Bradford
|-
! BD22
| KEIGHLEY
| Cowling, Haworth, Oakworth, Oxenhope, Cross Roads
| Bradford
|-
! BD23
| SKIPTON
| Carleton-in-Craven, Embsay, Thornton in Craven, Gargrave, Grassington, Hebden, Hellifield, Horton, Kettlewell, Kirkby Malham, Skipton, Threshfield, Tosside
| Craven, Harrogate, Ribble Valley
|-
! BD24
| SETTLE
| Giggleswick, Horton in Ribblesdale, Settle
| Craven
|-
! style="background:#FFFFFF;"|BD97
| style="background:#FFFFFF;"|BINGLEY
| style="background:#FFFFFF;"|
| style="background:#FFFFFF;"|non-geographic
|-
! style="background:#FFFFFF;"|BD98
| style="background:#FFFFFF;"|BRADFORD, SHIPLEY
| style="background:#FFFFFF;"|
| style="background:#FFFFFF;"|non-geographic
|-
! style="background:#FFFFFF;"|BD99
| style="background:#FFFFFF;"|BRADFORD
| style="background:#FFFFFF;"|Euroway Trading Estate M606
| style="background:#FFFFFF;"|non-geographic
|}

Map

See also
List of postcode areas in the United Kingdom
Postcode Address File

References

External links
Royal Mail's Postcode Address file
A quick introduction to Royal Mail's Postcode Address File (PAF)

Geography of the City of Bradford
Postcode areas covering Yorkshire and the Humber
Postcode areas covering North West England